Triphenyltin chloride is an organotin compound with formula Sn(C6H5)3Cl.  It is a colourless solid that dissolves in organic solvents.  It slowly reacts with water.  The main use for this compound is as a fungicide and antifoulant.
Triphenyl tin chloride is used as a chemosterilant.
Triphenyl tins used as a antifeedants against potato cutworm.

Hazards
Triphenyltin chloride is as toxic as hydrogen cyanide. It also caused detrimental effects on body weight, testicular size and structure, and decreased fertility in Holtzmann rats.

References

Triphenyltin compounds